The Leasowes  is a 57-hectare (around 141 acre) estate in Halesowen, historically in the county of Shropshire, England, comprising house and gardens. The parkland is now listed Grade I on English Heritage's Register of Parks and Gardens and the home of the Halesowen Golf Club. The name means "rough pasture land".

Shenstone (1743 to 1763) 

Developed between 1743 and 1763 by poet William Shenstone as a ferme ornée, the garden is one of the most admired early examples of the English garden. Its importance lies in its simplicity and the uncompromisingly rural appearance. Thomas Whately praises it in chapter LII of his Observations on Modern Gardening of 1770:

Horne (1763 to 1789) 

Shenstone died in 1763. The house and grounds were purchased by Edward Horne, who demolished Shenstone's house and built a new one on the same site completing it around 1776. He also built a walled garden and a hothouse.

Visit of Adams and Jefferson 
With Whately's treatise guiding him every step of the way, in April 1786, polymath Thomas Jefferson, the future third President of the United States, visited the Leasowes (then owned by Edward Horne) on his tour of English gardens in the company of his close friend and future second President of the US, John Adams.

Adams wrote in his diary:

Jefferson's more purposeful and inquisitive account in his Notes of a Tour of English Gardens delivers some additional background:

Later ownership and developments 

In 1789 Edward Horne sold the property to Major Francis Halliday who made considerable additions to the house and parkland. He added a stone portico at the entrance of the house and a folly hermitage in the high wood, which was decorated with "stained glass windows, furnace cinders, cowheel bones, horses' teeth, etc." (this was not in keeping with Shenstone's park improvements).

Halliday died in 1794, at the age of forty-five. In June 1795, Edward Butler Hartopp became the owner of the estate, and held possession till July 1800, when it was transferred to Charles Hamilton, and when he became insolvent in 1807, it passed into the hands of Matthias Attwood, who unlike the previous owners did not take any action to preserve William Shenstone's park features, and by the 1820s the park grounds had sunk into a "state of ruin and desolation". An extended description of the landscapes of Hagley Park and of the Leasowes in 1845, with reflections on Shenstone, is given by the Scottish geologist Hugh Miller.

The house, despite being not architecturally outstanding, is Grade I listed in view of its association with Shenstone and its importance in the history of landscape gardening. Between 1897 and 1907, it housed the Anstey College of Physical Education. Part of the site was purchased by the Halesowen Golf Club in 1906. Halesowen Council (later to become Dudley Metropolitan Borough Council) purchased The Leasowes in 1934 and since then the site has been managed as a public park with part of the site leased to Halesowen golf club.  Neglected since Shenstone's death, restoration of the 18th century landscape began in May 2008 and was completed by January 2009 (several months ahead of schedule). The restoration included the creation of a linear lake in the disused Lapal canal which runs across an earth filled embankbent 60 feet above Breaches pool to the south of the park.

Notes

References

External links 

Official site
The Leasowes – Garden History

Gardens in the West Midlands (county)
Grade I listed buildings in the West Midlands (county)
Halesowen